Thomas William (Thom) Puckey (Bexleyheath, England, 23 May 1948) is a British sculptor and, with Dirk Larsen, part of the performance-art group Reindeer Werk (1972–1980).

Works 
His sculptures appear in many public spaces in Amsterdam, Rotterdam, and other cities. In 1986 he was awarded the Sandberg Prize by the Amsterdam Fund for the Arts (AFK). In 2013 he designed a 5 euro commemorative coin in the Netherlands with the Peace Palace as subject.

References

External links 

British sculptors
British contemporary artists
British male sculptors
Living people
1948 births